Logan County is a county located in the U.S. state of Colorado. As of the 2020 census, the population was 21,528. The county seat is Sterling. The county was named for General John A. Logan.

Logan County comprises the Sterling, CO Micropolitan Statistical Area.

Geography

Adjacent counties

Cheyenne County, Nebraska - north
Phillips County - east
Sedgwick County - east
Yuma County - southeast
Washington County - south
Morgan County - southwest
Weld County - west
Kimball County, Nebraska - northwest

Major highways
  Interstate 76

  U.S. Highway 6
  U.S. Highway 138
  State Highway 14
  State Highway 61
  State Highway 63
  State Highway 113

State protected area
North Sterling State Park

Trails and byways
American Discovery Trail
Pawnee Pioneer Trails
South Platte Trail

Demographics

At the 2000 census there were 20,504 people, 7,551 households, and 5,066 families in the county.  The population density was 11 people per square mile (4/km2).  There were 8,424 housing units at an average density of 5 per square mile (2/km2).  The racial makeup of the county was 91.65% White, 2.05% Black or African American, 0.64% Native American, 0.40% Asian, 0.07% Pacific Islander, 3.77% from other races, and 1.43% from two or more races.  11.90% of the population were Hispanic or Latino of any race.
Of the 7,551 households 31.90% had children under the age of 18 living with them, 54.80% were married couples living together, 8.60% had a female householder with no husband present, and 32.90% were non-families. 28.50% of households were one person and 12.40% were one person aged 65 or older.  The average household size was 2.45 and the average family size was 3.02.

The age distribution was 24.70% under the age of 18, 10.80% from 18 to 24, 28.30% from 25 to 44, 21.70% from 45 to 64, and 14.50% 65 or older.  The median age was 36 years. For every 100 females there were 112.00 males.  For every 100 females age 18 and over, there were 114.60 males.

The median household income was $32,724 and the median family income  was $42,241. Males had a median income of $28,155 versus $21,110 for females. The per capita income for the county was $16,721.  About 9.00% of families and 12.20% of the population were below the poverty line, including 13.40% of those under age 18 and 10.90% of those age 65 or over.

Politics
Logan County is strongly Republican in presidential elections. Since 1888, the county has failed to back the Republican candidate in only six presidential elections, most recently in 1964 in the midst of Lyndon B. Johnson's national landslide victory.

Communities

City
Sterling

Towns
Crook
Fleming
Iliff
Merino
Peetz

Census-designated places
Atwood
Padroni

Unincorporated communities
Dailey
Proctor
Willard

Ghost towns

Ackerman
Armstrong
Beta
Buchanan
Galien
Graylin
Griff
Jessica
Kelly
Lesy
Logan
Marcott
Mount Hope
New Haven
Powell
Red Lion
Rockland
Selma
Shahan
St. Petersberg
Tobin
Twin Mills
Westplains
Winston

See also

Outline of Colorado
Index of Colorado-related articles
Colorado census statistical areas
Sterling Micropolitan Statistical Area
National Register of Historic Places listings in Logan County, Colorado

References

External links

Colorado County Evolution by Don Stanwyck
Colorado Historical Society

 

 
Colorado counties
1887 establishments in Colorado
Eastern Plains
Populated places established in 1887